Jędrzejewo may refer to the following places:
Jędrzejewo, Gmina Czarnków in Greater Poland Voivodeship (west-central Poland)
Jędrzejewo, Kuyavian-Pomeranian Voivodeship (north-central Poland)
Jędrzejewo, Masovian Voivodeship (east-central Poland)
Jędrzejewo, Gmina Lubasz in Greater Poland Voivodeship (west-central Poland)